The 32nd Alaska State Legislature is the current meeting of the legislative branch of Alaska's state government. It began meeting in Juneau, Alaska on January 19, 2021 and will hold authority until January 2023. Its initial 60-person membership was set by the 2020 Alaska elections, but the Alaska House of Representatives has not yet chosen a leader, and it is not clear which party (or a multipartisan coalition) will be in charge. The Alaska Senate is led by a 14-member majority that includes 13 Republicans and one Democratic member.

Senate 

↑: Senator was originally appointed
: Terms listed as up for election in 2024 are subject to truncation by proclamation of the Alaska Redistricing Board.

House 

↑: Representative was originally appointed

Current composition

See also
 List of Alaska State Legislatures
 31st Alaska State Legislature, the legislature preceding this one
 33rd Alaska State Legislature, the legislature following this one
 List of governors of Alaska
 List of speakers of the Alaska House of Representatives
 Alaska Legislature
 Alaska Senate
 Alaska State Senate election, 2020
 {AKLeg.gov}

References

2021 in Alaska
Alaska
2022 in Alaska
Alaska
Alaska legislative sessions